Mattei may refer to:

 Mattei (surname)
 Mattei, California
 Mattei family, noble Roman family
 The Mattei Affair (Italian: Il Caso Mattei), a 1972 film
 Mattei sarcophagus I, known as Mattei I
 Electrohomeopathy, also Mattei cancer cure

See also
Matteis, surname